The Premier of the Turks and Caicos Islands is the political leader and head of government. The post of premier is the equivalent to chief minister or prime minister in other British Overseas Territories. It is the highest political level that can be attained within the British colonial system. Prior to 2006, the position was known as the Chief Minister of the Turks and Caicos Islands.

The premier and Cabinet (consisting of all the most senior ministers) are collectively accountable for their policies and actions to King Charles III, to the House of Assembly, to their political party and ultimately to the electorate.

The current premier is Charles Washington Misick, since 20 February 2021.

Constitutional background
A new constitution, after being laid in the Turks and Caicos parliament and receiving Queen Elizabeth II's signature, entered into force on 9 August 2006. The new constitution of the Turks and Caicos Islands changed the title of Chief Minister and Deputy Chief Minister to Premier and Deputy Premier.

On 14 August 2009, the United Kingdom suspended the Turks and Caicos' self-government after allegations of ministerial corruption. The prerogative of the ministerial government and the House of Assembly are vested in the islands' incumbent governor for a period of up to two years, with possible extensions.

List

(Dates in italics indicate de facto continuation of office)

See also
 List of current heads of government in the United Kingdom and dependencies
 Politics of the Turks and Caicos Islands
 Governor of the Turks and Caicos Islands

References

Further reading

 
Turks and Caicos Islands, List of Premiers of the
Premier